The Lake Superior Railroad Museum  is a railroad museum in Duluth, Minnesota, United States. 

Opened in 1973, the museum focuses on railroading in the Lake Superior region. It is housed in the restored Duluth Union Depot complex. 

The museum also operates the North Shore Scenic Railroad, which runs excursion trains from Memorial Day through mid-October using historic rail equipment from the museum collection. 

The collection includes the William Crooks, which became the first locomotive to operate in the state of Minnesota in 1861, and Duluth, Missabe and Iron Range Railway Number 227, a 2-8-8-4 "Yellowstone" locomotive that was among the largest steam engines to operate.

Several museum spaces are available for rent as an event venue.

Collection

Steam locomotives

Electric locomotives

Diesel locomotives

Diesel railcars

Passenger Cars

Cabooses
 Burlington Northern #12410
 Duluth, Missabe & Iron Range #C-9
 Duluth, Missabe & Iron Range #C-12
 Duluth, Missabe & Iron Range #C-205
 Duluth, Winnipeg and Pacific #76923
 Great Northern #X-452
 Northern Pacific #1311
 Soo Line #1
 Soo Line #99017

Service & miscellaneous equipment
 Burlington Northern Motor Powered Wrecker #D-161 - Built 1915
 Erie Mining Co. #8440 Pontiac Hy-rail Inspection Car - Built 1957
 Northern Pacific Rotary Snow Plow #2 - Built 1887 by the Cooke Locomotive and Machine Works, #2 is the world's oldest surviving rotary snow plow. The museum acquired it in 1975 and it was designated a Historic Mechanical Engineering Landmark in 2015.
 Northern Pacific Wedge Snowplow #19 - Built 1907
 Northern Pacific Steam Powered Wrecker #38 - Built 1913
1920 McGiffert log loader

Former equipment
 Burlington Northern, Dynamometer Car #B10: Sold to the Ironhorse Railroad Park
 Canadian National, Coach #5375: Sold to the Mid-Continent Railway Museum
 Duluth Missabe & Iron Range, Refrigerator Car #7122: Sold to the Mid-Continent Railway Museum
 Duluth, Missabe & Iron Range, EMD SD-M #316: Traded for Northern Pacific #245
 Metra, Bi-Level Coach #7781: Scrapped 
 Milwaukee Road, EMD F7B #X1: Sold to the Escanaba & Lake Superior Railroad
 Minntac, EMD SW9 #935: Sold to Cargill, to provide funds for the purchase of GN #192
 Northern States Power Co, EMD SW1 #1364: Given to Rail Legacy Museum, St. Cloud
 Peavey Grain Co, EMD SW1 #1279: Scrapped after engine seized

See also
List of heritage railroads in the United States

References

External links

Museum's website

Railroad museums in Minnesota
Duluth–Superior metropolitan area
Museums in Duluth, Minnesota